The Decree of Diopeithes was instituted by the opponents of Pericles in an attempt to discredit Anaxagoras. The date is not exact, as sources give different years. Some sources list the arrest and trial of Anaxagoras as early as 437/6 BCE, others at 434 BCE, and still others 432. The charges stemmed from his observations of the heavens and asserting that there were no lunar and solar deities.

According to the Oxford Classical Dictionary, the only reference to this decree comes from Plutarch's Pericles:

A reference to the trial of Anaxagoras was mentioned by Plato in Apology:

References

Presocratic philosophy